Young Buckethead is a series of Buckethead and Deli Creeps related releases by Jas Obrecht's record label Avabella:
 Young Buckethead Vol. 1, a DVD released in 2006 and containing footage from 1990 and 1991
 Young Buckethead Vol. 2, a DVD released in 2006 and containing footage from 1990 and 1991
 Acoustic Shards, an album released in 2007 and containing recordings from 1991
 From the Coop, an album released in 2008 and containing demo recordings from 1988

External links
 Avabella's official Young Buckethead site

Buckethead